Monticello High School (MHS) is a suburban public high school located in Albemarle County, Virginia, United States outside Charlottesville. Opened in 1998, it is one of three traditional comprehensive high schools in the Albemarle County Public Schools System. The school is named after Monticello, the nearby estate of President Thomas Jefferson.

With an enrollment of 1,185 students in grades 9 through 12, Monticello receives students from Walton and Burley Middle Schools, which cover the southern and eastern portions of Albemarle county.  The school colors are black and gold, and the mascot is a Mustang.  The school's fight song uses the tune of The Victors.

Effective in the 2019–20 school year, Monticello, along with all the other Albemarle County high schools, operates on a Four-by-Four yearlong schedule, with two sets of classes alternating days and Fridays switching between the two. Dr. Beth Costa became Monticello High School's seventh principal in July 2022.

Accolades and academics 

In the spring of 2006, biology teacher Jeremy Dove was recognized with the Presidential Award for Excellence in Mathematics and Science Teaching. MHS has a reputation as Albemarle County's "green school," as it was built to be energy-efficient and environmentally friendly, with skylights, a natural biofilter in the parking lot, solar panels, and an on-campus artificial wetland.

Monticello High School is fully accredited by the Virginia State Board of Education and the Southern Association of Colleges and Schools.  The school offers 19 Advanced Placement courses, which are: English 11 and 12, European History, US History, US Government, World History, Human Geography, Biology II, French V, Spanish V, German V, Psychology, Statistics, Calculus AB, Calculus BC, Physics II, Chemistry II, Environmental Science, and Studio Art.

MHS uses Albemarle County's standard grading scale, according to which: A=90-100, B=89-80, C=79-70, D=69-60 and F =59 and below.  A weighed average is used to determine class rank, although no valedictorian or salutatorian is named at graduation.

Athletics 
Monticello High School offers 25 interscholastic sports as well as theater, scholastic bowl, and debate programs.

Since it opened in 1998, Monticello has been a member of the Jefferson District, which includes seven other area high schools in Region II of the Virginia High School League's AA classification (A-AAA scale).  In football, the school has shifted between Divisions 3 and 4 of Class AA.  For the 2009-2011 two season cycle, MHS competes in Division 3.

Athletics Director Matthew Pearman has been at MHS since October 2014, following the resignation of former AD Fitzgerald Barnes who had been at MHS since the school opened. Barnes resigned in September 2014, after admitting to being involved with David Deane, the Vice President of Downtown Athletic, and Charles Phillips, the Vice President of Sales for Team Distributor, a sports apparel retailer in Maryland, in a scheme to fix bids on athletic apparel purchased for Monticello High School.

The Mustangs won at least 8 games each football season from 2002 to 2008. In 2003, Monticello advanced to the Division 3 state championship and lost to Gretna High School. The Mustangs returned to the Division 3 State Championship in 2007 and defeated Richlands High School 36–22, clinching the first state championship for any Charlottesville-area high school football team. In the following 2008 season, Coach Bicknell's team claimed back-to-back Region II Championships, but the season ended abruptly after a controversial 4th Quarter penalty in a Division 3 state semifinal game at James Monroe High School.

The Monticello debate team has been represented in the VHSL State Championship tournament twice in the last three years.

The Monticello Girls Cross Country team were state runner-ups in the 2015 season.

Four Monticello teams have won VHSL state championships - Football, 2007; Girls Swim & Dive, 2021; Boys Indoor Track & Field, 2021; eSports League of Legends, 2022.

On-campus facilities include a multi-purpose stadium with track, softball and baseball fields, a cross country running trail, multiple practice fields, two gymnasiums and weight rooms. The school's boys and girls tennis teams use the courts at adjacent Piedmont Virginia Community College. As of August 2009, Mustangs Stadium features an All Turf Playing Field. Construction began in June 2009 after several years of planning and fundraising.

Since 2002, Mustang Stadium has also served as the venue for the Jefferson Classic, a high school marching band contest held the first Saturday in October and sponsored by the Monticello Bands and Music Boosters.

Notable alumni
Mike Brown – Wide Receiver, formerly of the Jacksonville Jaguars
Ben King – World-class professional cyclist, has participated in several international races including the Tour De France.

References

External links

 http://www2.k12albemarle.org/school/mohs/ - Official School Website
 http://www.monticellomustangs.org - Monticello Athletics website
 https://web.archive.org/web/20050926001054/http://www.principals.org/s_nassp/index.asp - National Association of Secondary School Principals

Public high schools in Virginia
Educational institutions established in 1998
Schools in Albemarle County, Virginia
1998 establishments in Virginia